In September 2016, the International Union for Conservation of Nature (IUCN) listed 535 near threatened mollusc species. Of all evaluated mollusc species, 7.4% are listed as near threatened. 
The IUCN also lists nine mollusc subspecies as near threatened.

No subpopulations of molluscs have been evaluated by the IUCN.

This is a complete list of near threatened mollusc species and subspecies evaluated by the IUCN.

Gastropods
There are 477 species and four subspecies of gastropod assessed as near threatened.

Stylommatophora
Stylommatophora includes the majority of land snails and slugs. There are 250 species and four subspecies in the order Stylommatophora assessed as near threatened.

Zonitids

Clausiliids
Species

Subspecies
Alopia bielzii clathrata
Macrogastra lineolata euzieriana

Helminthoglyptids

Camaenids
Species

Subspecies
Glyptorhagada wilkawillina umbilicata

Vertiginids

Cochlicellids

Trissexodontids

Helicids

Hygromiids
Species

Subspecies
Xerocrassa montserratensis betulonensis

Vitrinids

Chondrinids

Enids

Argnids

Other Stylommatophora species

Littorinimorpha
There are 115 species in the order Littorinimorpha assessed as near threatened.

Hydrobiids

Bithyniids

Moitessieriids

Assimineids
Omphalotropis circumlineata
Omphalotropis zelriolata

Pomatiopsids

Stenothyrids
Stenothyra khongi
Stenothyra wykoffi

Sorbeoconcha

Architaenioglossa
There are 41 species in the order Architaenioglossa assessed as near threatened.

Pupinids
Pupina coxeni
Pupina pfeifferi

Diplommatinids

Aciculids

Viviparids

Ampullariids

Craspedopomatids
Craspedopoma hespericum
Craspedopoma monizianum

Lower Heterobranchia species
Valvata rhabdota
Valvata stenotrema

Cycloneritimorpha

Hygrophila species

Neogastropoda
There are 29 species in the order Neogastropoda assessed as near threatened.

Buccinids
Ranella olearia
Ranella parthenopaeum

Muricids
Latiaxis babelis

Conids

Bivalvia
There are 57 species and five subspecies in the class Bivalvia assessed as near threatened.

Unionida
There are 49 species and five subspecies in the order Unionoida assessed as near threatened.

Unionids
Species

Subspecies

Hyriids
Southern river mussel (Hyridella narracanensis)
South Esk freshwater mussel (Velesunio moretonicus)

Cardiida

Venerida

Cephalopods
Giant Australian cuttlefish (Sepia apama)

See also 
 Lists of IUCN Red List near threatened species
 List of least concern molluscs
 List of vulnerable molluscs
 List of endangered molluscs
 List of critically endangered molluscs
 List of recently extinct molluscs
 List of data deficient molluscs

References 

Molluscs
Near threatened molluscs
Near threatened molluscs